William Huddleston (1826–1894) was a British colonial administrator who acted as the Governor of Madras from 24 May 1881 to 5 November 1881.

References 
 List of Governors of Madras, Worldstatesmen.org

1826 births
1894 deaths
Governors of Madras